Gulan Avci (born 20 August 1977) is a Swedish politician of Kurdish descent, representing the Liberal Party.

She was elected deputy Member of Parliament in 2006 and served March – September 2009 and February – April 2010. In March 2010, she broke with her party line and voted in favor of the Recognition of the Armenian Genocide in Swedish Parliament. Avci was chairperson of the Kurdish Youth of Sweden between 1998–2000.

She is married to fellow liberal politician Fredrik Malm.

References

External links
 Gulan Avci official website

1977 births
21st-century Swedish women politicians
Living people
Members of the Riksdag 2006–2010
Members of the Riksdag 2018–2022
Members of the Riksdag 2022–2026
Members of the Riksdag from the Liberals (Sweden)
Swedish people of Kurdish descent
Swedish politicians of Kurdish descent
Women members of the Riksdag